Sedale Eugene Threatt (born September 10, 1961) is an American former professional basketball player in the National Basketball Association (NBA). Born in Atlanta, Georgia, Threatt played college basketball at the West Virginia Institute of Technology from 1979 to 1983. Nicknamed "The Thief" for his ability to steal the basketball, Threatt  has the distinction of being the last sixth round pick to play in the NBA (the NBA draft was shortened to the now-current two rounds in 1989), played in the NBA from 1983–1997 and finished his basketball career overseas.

Professional career
Threatt was drafted by the Philadelphia 76ers in the sixth round of the 1983 NBA draft, and is the only player from West Virginia Tech to have ever played in the NBA. During the 1986 NBA playoffs, Threatt played a key role for the 76ers, averaging then career-highs of 13.7 points, 3.5 assists, and 1.9 steals per game. During the Eastern Conference Semifinals against the Bucks, Threatt led all scorers with 28 points during the series deciding game seven, but Philadelphia lost by one point, 113-112. In total, Threatt played for four seasons with the 76ers and was traded to the Chicago Bulls in 1986. In 1988, he was traded to the Seattle SuperSonics for Sam Vincent. He played for Seattle for four seasons before being traded to the Los Angeles Lakers on October 2, 1991, in exchange for three second round draft picks.

Threatt was expected to play a backup role to Magic Johnson. However, after Johnson's sudden retirement for medical reasons (he announced that he was HIV positive), Threatt became the starting point guard. Threatt's ability to steal the ball earned him the nickname "The Thief" from Lakers commentators Chick Hearn and Stu Lantz. Threatt led the Lakers in assists, steals and minutes played each in his first two seasons. In 1992-93, he became the second player in Lakers franchise history (after Johnson) to lead the Lakers in scoring (15.1), assists (6.9), and steals (1.7).

He scored a career high 42 points against the New York Knicks on March 10, 1992, and scored a career playoff high 35 points in Game 1 of the 1993 Western Conference Quarterfinals against the Phoenix Suns. He retired from the NBA after the 1996-97 season and went on to play basketball with the Gymnastikos S. Larissas (Greece) before retiring in 2002.

Personal life
Threatt is thought to have fathered at least fourteen children, and been married twice. He married his first wife, Nicole Plotzker, in 1992. She later left him for Dr. Dre; his second marriage was to Britt Johnson.

In 2000, Threatt was sentenced to six months in prison for failing to pay child support. Threatt had a plea deal with prosecutors, who recommended five months of probation, but U.S. District Judge Mark L. Wolf rejected the agreement and sentenced him to prison. Wolf also ordered Threatt to comply with five other outstanding child-support orders for children in other jurisdictions.

Threatt currently lives in Melbourne, Australia, working alongside his eldest son, Sedale Threatt Jr., in his company, Australian Basketball Development (AUBD). Threatt has another son also named Sedale Threatt Jr., who attended college at Lehigh University and played quarterback on the football team. This Sedale Jr. later went into acting.

References

External links
Player Statistics at Basketball-Reference.com
Historical Player Profile at NBA.com
College and NBA statistics at basketballreference.com

1961 births
Living people
African-American basketball players
American expatriate basketball people in Australia
American expatriate basketball people in France
American expatriate basketball people in Greece
American expatriate basketball people in Switzerland
American men's basketball players
Basketball players from Atlanta
Chicago Bulls players
Greek Basket League players
Gymnastikos S. Larissas B.C. players
Houston Rockets players
Los Angeles Lakers players
Paris Racing Basket players
Philadelphia 76ers draft picks
Philadelphia 76ers players
Point guards
Seattle SuperSonics players
West Virginia Tech Golden Bears men's basketball players
21st-century African-American people
20th-century African-American sportspeople